Skoblikov is a Russian masculine surname, its feminine counterpart is Skoblikova. It may refer to
Lidiya Skoblikova (born 1939), Russian speed skater and coach
Yevgeni Skoblikov (born 1990), Russian football player

Russian-language surnames